The East London Advertiser is a weekly local newspaper in east London, England covering primarily the borough of Tower Hamlets. It was formed in late 2011 by Archant's merging of The Docklands and the East London Advertiser.  The East London Advertiser was founded in 1866 and had been owned by Archant since 2003. It merged with freesheet The Docklands in 2011.

In June 2008 the East London Advertiser scooped two awards at the annual UK Press Gazette Regional Press Awards. It was named Weekly Paper of the Year (Circulation less than 20,000) and its deputy editor, Ted Jeory, was named Reporter of the Year (Weeklies), partly for his expose of the First Solution Money Transfer crisis in 2007.

References

London newspapers
Media and communications in the London Borough of Tower Hamlets
Publications established in 1866
1866 establishments in England
1866 in London